O'Hanlon is an Irish surname associated with the Ó hAnluain sept. As with other similar names, the added prefix "O'" means "son of" (Hanlon).

Notable people with that surname include:

 Ardal O'Hanlon (born 1965), Irish comedian
 Evan O'Hanlon (born 1988), Australian Paralympian
 Fergal O'Hanlon (1936–1957, Irish Republican Army member
 Fran O'Hanlon (born 1948), Lafayette Leopards men's basketball head coach
 George O'Hanlon (1912–1989), American actor 
 John O'Hanlon (chess player) (1876–1960), Irish chess master
 John O'Hanlon (Lackaghmore) (1889–1920), Sinn Féin member shot during the Irish War of Independence
 John O'Hanlon (politician) (1872–1956), Irish politician and journalist
 John O'Hanlon (writer) (1821–1905), Irish priest and writer
 Killian O'Hanlon (born 1993), Gaelic footballer
 Michael E. O'Hanlon (born 1961), American policy consultant
 Michael F. O'Hanlon (1890–1967), Irish politician
 Paddy O'Hanlon (1944–2009), Irish politician
 Pat O'Hanlon, (born 1991), Australian Rugby League player
 Redmond O'Hanlon, British writer
 Redmond O'Hanlon (outlaw), 17th-century Irish rapparee
 Rory O'Hanlon, Irish politician
 Sean O'Hanlon, English footballer
 Siobhán O'Hanlon, Sinn Féin politician
 Virginia O'Hanlon, catalyst for "Yes, Virginia, there is a Santa Claus"

See also 
 
 Hanlon

References
 The O'Hanlons of Orior 1558–1691:Part II, Joseph Canning, Seanchas Ard Mhacha, pp. 111–192, 2002.